The 1919 Tour of Flanders was the third edition of the Tour of Flanders road cycling race was held on 23 March 1919 and was won by the Belgian Henri Van Lerberghe. Van Lerberghe broke clear at 120 km from the finish in a solo effort and maintained his lead to the finish. He finished 14 minutes ahead of the first group of chasers, the largest winning margin in the history of the race. Léon Buysse won the sprint for second place before Jules Van Hevel. The race started in the centre of Ghent and finished in Gentbrugge, on the outskirts of Ghent.

It was the first Tour of Flanders after a five-year hiatus due to the First World War. As from this edition, the Tour of Flanders has been organized annually, even during the Second World War; the longest uninterrupted streak of any cycling race.

Race summary
Before the start of the race, Henri Van Lerberghe declared to the peloton that he was going to drop everyone and impose himself on the race alone. Van Lerberghe attacked into a headwind whilst there was still 120 km to be travelled, in what looked like an attack without any chance of success. During his breakaway, he saw an assistant with a bag of food planned for Marcel Buysse and convinced him that Buysse had abandoned, so as to take his food. Later, he had to pause at a level crossing as there was a train going past at the time. Van Lerberghe did not wait for the train to pass and decided to enter a train car with his bike to get out on the other side. He went on to reach the finish line with a margin of 14 minutes over the next placed rider, the largest margin in the history of the Tour of Flanders. After crossing the line and riding his lap of honour, Van Lerberghe declared to the crowd and, in all sincerity: "Go home; I'm half a day ahead of the pack."

Results

References

External links
 Tour des Flandres 1919 sur bikeraceinfo.com

Tour of Flanders
1919 in road cycling
1919 in Belgian sport
March 1919 sports events